Geffas Apartments is a historic three-story building in Ogden, Utah. It was built in 1922 for investor Theodore Geffas, an immigrant from Greece. Geffas was also the owner of the City Cafe, the Elite Cafe, and the Streetcar Lunch. He lived in the building with his wife, née Katie Storey and their three daughters; he died in 1955. It has been listed on the National Register of Historic Places since December 31, 1987.

References

Buildings and structures in Ogden, Utah
National Register of Historic Places in Weber County, Utah
Residential buildings completed in 1922
1922 establishments in Utah